The Seyss-Inquart Government (also called the Anschluss government) was the last federal government of Austria before the annexation of Austria into the German Reich, and existed only from 11 to 13 March 1938.

Background
Between 23:00 and 24:00 on 11 March, President Wilhelm Miklas appointed Seyss-Inquart Chancellor. At 1:30 on 12 March, Hugo Jury announced the new government from the balcony of the Federal Chancellery.

Composition
The composition of the government were as such:

References

Citations

Bibliography
 
 

1930s in Austria
1938 establishments in Austria
Seyss-Inquart
Cabinets established in 1938